The 1991 IBM ATP Tour was the elite tour for professional men's tennis organized by the ATP Tour. The IBM ATP Tour included the Grand Slam tournaments (organized by the International Tennis Federation (ITF)), the ATP Championship Series, Single-Week, the ATP Championship Series, the ATP World Series and the ATP Tour World Championships. The World Team Cup, Davis Cup (organized by the ITF) and Grand Slam Cup (organized by the ITF) are included in this calendar but did not count towards the Tour.

Schedule 
This is the complete schedule of events on the 1991 IBM ATP Tour, with player progression documented from the quarterfinals stage.

Key

January

February

March

April

May

June

July

August

September

October

November

December

ATP rankings

Statistical information 
List of players and singles titles won, alphabetically by last name:

  Andre Agassi – Orlando, Washington, D.C. (2)
  Jordi Arrese – Madrid, Búzios (2)
  Patrick Baur – Guarujá, Seoul (2)
  Boris Becker – Australian Open, Stockholm Masters (2)
  Sergi Bruguera – Estoril, Monte Carlo Masters, Athens (3)
  Darren Cahill – San Francisco (1)
  Paolo Canè – Bologna (1)
  Omar Camporese – Rotterdam (1)
  Michael Chang – Birmingham (1)
  Andrei Cherkasov – Moscow (1)
  Andrei Chesnokov – Canada Masters (1)
  Jim Courier – Indian Wells Masters, Miami Masters, French Open (3)
  Stefan Edberg – Stuttgart, Tokyo, London, US Open, Sydney Indoors, Tokyo Indoors (6)
  Frédéric Fontang – Palermo (1)
  Guy Forget – Sydney, Brussels, Cincinnati Masters, Bordeaux, Toulouse, Paris Masters (6)
  Javier Frana – Guarujá (1)
  Richard Fromberg – Wellington (1)
  Andrés Gómez – Brasília (1)
  Magnus Gustafsson – Munich, Båstad, Hilversum (3)
  Jakob Hlasek – Basel (1)
  Goran Ivanišević – Manchester (1)
  Martín Jaite – Nice (1)
  Petr Korda – New Haven, Berlin (2)
  Richard Krajicek – Hong Kong (1)
  Nicklas Kulti – Adelaide (1)
  Leonardo Lavalle – Tel Aviv (1)
  Ivan Lendl – Philadelphia, Memphis, Long Island (3)
  John McEnroe – Chicago (1)
  Christian Miniussi – São Paulo (1)
  Thomas Muster – Florence, Geneva (2)
  Karel Nováček – Auckland, Hamburg Masters, Kitzbühel, Prague (4)
  Guillermo Pérez Roldán – San Marino (1)
  Dimitri Poliakov – Umag (1)
  Gianluca Pozzi – Brisbane (1)
  Richey Reneberg – Tampa (1)
  Christian Saceanu – Rosmalen (1)
  Pete Sampras – Los Angeles, Indianapolis, Lyon, Season-Ending Championships (4)
  Emilio Sánchez – Barcelona, Rome Masters, Gstaad (3)
  Bryan Shelton – Newport (1)
  Jan Siemerink – Singapore (1)
  Carl-Uwe Steeb – Genova (1)
  Michael Stich – Wimbledon, Stuttgart, Schenectady, Vienna (4)
  Jonas Svensson – Copenhagen (1)
  Alexander Volkov – Milan (1)
  Jaime Yzaga – Charlotte (1)

The following players won their first title:
  Patrick Baur
  Sergi Bruguera
  Omar Camporese
  Frédéric Fontang
  Javier Frana
  Magnus Gustafsson
  Petr Korda
  Richard Krajicek
  Leonardo Lavalle
  Christian Miniussi
  Dimitri Poliakov
  Gianluca Pozzi
  Richey Reneberg
  Bryan Shelton
  Jan Siemerink
  Alexander Volkov

See also 
 1991 WTA Tour

External links 
 1991 ATP Results Archive
 History Men's Professional Tours

 
ATP Tour
ATP Tour seasons